Classic Cher was the third concert residency by American singer-actress Cher. The show is performed in  Las Vegas, Oxon Hill, and Atlantic City.

Set list 
This set list is representative for the opening concert on February 8, 2017.
"Woman's World"
"Strong Enough"
"Gayatri Mantra"
"All or Nothing"
"The Beat Goes On”
"All I Really Want to Do"
"I Got You Babe"
"Gypsys, Tramps & Thieves"
"Dark Lady"
"Half-Breed"
"Welcome to Burlesque"
"Take Me Home"
"After All"
"Walking in Memphis"
"The Shoop Shoop Song (It's in His Kiss)"
"I Found Someone"
"If I Could Turn Back Time"

Encore
"Believe"

Shows

Cancelled and postponed shows

Personnel
Lead Vocals: Cher
Tour Director: Nick Cua
Musical Director: Ollie Marland 
Costume Design: Bob Mackie

Band
Keyboards: Ollie Marland and Darrell Smith
Guitars: Joel Hoekstra / David Barry
Bass: Ashley Reeves
Drums: Jason Sutter
Background vocals: Nikki Tillman
Background vocals: Jodi Katz

Dancers
Dancer: Marlon Pelayo
Dancer: Daniel Dory
Dancer: Melanie Lewis-Yribar
Dancer: Jamal Story
Dancer: Ben Bigler
Dancer: Britta Grant
Dancer: Bailey Swift
Dancer: Sumayah McRae
Dancer: SheilaJoy Burford
Dancer: Dujuan Smart Jr
Dancer: Ferly Prado

References 

Concert residencies in the Las Vegas Valley
Cher concert residencies
2017 concert residencies
2018 concert residencies
2019 concert residencies
2020 concert residencies
Park MGM